Calliotropis pataxo is a species of sea snail, a marine gastropod mollusc in the family Eucyclidae.

Description

Distribution

References

External links

pataxo
Gastropods described in 2009